Hills and Holes may refer to:
 Barnack Hills & Holes National Nature Reserve in Cambridgeshire
 part of Bradlaugh Fields, a Local Nature Reserve in Northampton
 Hills And Holes And Sookholme Brook, Warsop, a Site of Special Scientific Interest in Mansfield, Nottinghamshire